Justice Coalition may refer to:

Justice Coalition (Mongolia), a Mongolian parliamentary coalition in opposition, made up of Mongolian National Democratic Party and Mongolian People's Revolutionary Party
Social Justice Coalition (South Africa) (SJC), South African community NGO that focuses on campaigning for safety and security
Social Justice Coalition (Egypt), an earlier electoral alliance in Egypt